Ximena Loreto Órdenes Neira (born 9 March 1973) is a Chilean sociologist and politician. She is currently a senator for Constituency 14, corresponding to Aysén Region.

In the first Bachelet government, she was governor of Aysén Province from 2006 to 2008, and regional ministerial secretary of public works from 2008 to 2010.

Biography
Ximena Órdenes was born in Coyhaique on 9 March 1973, the daughter of Segismundo Órdenes González and Danira Neira Vera. Her grandfather, Daniel Neira, was the founder of the Socialist Party in Aysén Region and a councilor. Her parents were founders of the Party for Democracy (PPD) in Aysén, which she also joined. Her mother was president of the Aysén Human Rights Group.

Her early education took place at Liceo San Felipe Benicio in Coyhaique. She later studied sociology at the University of the Republic, Santiago. She completed a diploma in gender and development at Andrés Bello National University.

She has one child.

Political career
Órdenes' formal career in public service began in 2003, when she was appointed by President Ricardo Lagos as regional director of the National Women's Service (SERNAM), a position she held until 2006. In March of that year, she was appointed governor of Aysén Province by President Michelle Bachelet. In November 2008, she became regional ministerial secretary for public works in Aysén Region, remaining in office until March 2010.

In 2013, she was elected  for Coyhaique, obtaining 1,583 votes, equivalent to 8.2% of the total. She never held the office, due to the fact that President Bachelet appointed her , effective 11 March 2014. In November 2016, she resigned her membership in the PPD, of which she had been national vice president.

She was elected with 5,405 votes, equivalent to 15.1% of the total. For the second round of the election, she joined the command of the independent candidate Alejandro Guillier.

She took office as senator on 11 March 2018, becoming the first woman to hold the office representing Aysén Region. Since 21 March 2018, she has been a member of the permanent commissions of public works, the environment, and national assets.

References

External links
 
 Ximena Órdenes Neira at the Senate of Chile

Living people
1973 births
Members of the Senate of Chile
Intendants of Aysén Region
Senators of the LV Legislative Period of the National Congress of Chile
Senators of the LVI Legislative Period of the National Congress of Chile
Chilean sociologists
Governors of provinces of Chile
Party for Democracy (Chile) politicians
People from Aysén Region
Women governors of provinces of Chile
Women members of the Senate of Chile
Chilean women sociologists
21st-century Chilean politicians
21st-century Chilean women politicians
Andrés Bello National University alumni